Fackson is a Zambian male given name. Notable people with the name include:

 Fackson Kapumbu (born 1990), Zambian footballer
 Fackson Nkandu (born 1971), Zambian long-distance runner
 Fackson Shamenda (born 1950), Zambian trade unionist and politician

African masculine given names